Jason Parker may refer to:
Jason Parker (sport shooter) (born 1974), American sport shooter
Jason Parker (American football) (born 1985), American football player 
Jason Parker (speed skater) (born 1975), Canadian speed skater 
Jason Parker, a fictional character in The Suite Life of Zack & Cody